This is the discography of American rock singer Sophie B. Hawkins.

Hawkins had commercial success throughout the early-to-mid 1990s including her most successful hit singles "Damn I Wish I Was Your Lover", "Right Beside You", and "As I Lay Me Down".

Hawkins's music has not charted since her 1999 album Timbre reached number 87 in Germany.

Albums

Studio albums

Compilation albums

Live albums

Singles

References

Discographies of American artists
Pop music discographies
Rock music discographies